Julien Cardy (born 29 September 1981) is a French former professional footballer who played as a midfielder for Toulouse FC, FC Metz, Tours FC, AC Arles-Avignon, and En Avant de Guingamp.

Career
Following his release by En Avant de Guingamp in summer 2016, 35-year-old Cardy had not signed for a new club by October 2016 and he expected to end his profession career.

Career statistics

References

External links

1981 births
Living people
Sportspeople from Pau, Pyrénées-Atlantiques
French footballers
Footballers from Nouvelle-Aquitaine
Association football midfielders
Ligue 1 players
Ligue 2 players
FC Nantes players
Toulouse FC players
FC Metz players
Tours FC players
AC Arlésien players
En Avant Guingamp players